Rybinsk is a city in Yaroslav Oblast, Russia.

Rybinsk may also refer to:
Rybinsk Urban Okrug, a municipal formation which the city of oblast significance of Rybinsk in Yaroslavl Oblast, Russia is incorporated as
Rybinsk (inhabited locality), several inhabited localities in Russia
Rybinsk Reservoir, a water reservoir on the Volga River, Russia
Rybinsk Hydroelectric Station, a hydroelectric station on the Volga and Sheksna Rivers, Russia
FSC Rybinsk (1937–2009), defunct association football team from Rybinsk, Russia
HC Rybinsk, ice hockey team from Rybinsk, Russia